St. Anthony Airport  is located  west northwest of St. Anthony, Newfoundland and Labrador, Canada.

Airlines and destinations

References

External links

Certified airports in Newfoundland and Labrador